The 1915 Ohio Green and White football team was an American football team that represented Ohio University in the Ohio Athletic Conference (OAC) during the 1915 college football season. In its third season under head coach M. B. Banks, the team compiled an 8–1 record (2–1 against conference opponents), finished in fourth place out of 15 teams in the OAC, and outscored opponents by a total of 175 to 33.

Schedule

References

Ohio
Ohio Bobcats football seasons
Ohio Green and White football